Ahmed bin Mohammad Al-Issa (born 20 December 1960) is a Saudi Arabian politician. He served as Minister of Education of Saudi Arabia from 15 December 2015 to 27 December 2018.

Biography

Education
Ahmed bin Mohammad Al-Issa received a Bachelor of Art degree from the History department of the King Saud University in 1983. He earned a master's degree in Education in 1989, and a Ph.D. in Education in 1993, from the Pennsylvania State University. In 2009, he completed an advanced program in management and leadership at Oxford University.

In 2002, Ahmed bin Mohammad Al-Issa became a full-time advisor for the Al Yamamah University project, Dean from 2003 to 2008, and Director the following year. In 2011, Ahmed bin Mohammad Al-Issa takes up the post of Director General of the Strategic Studies Department at the Royal Court.

Career
Al-Issa began his career in 1990 as associate Dean of Educational Affairs at the Riyadh College of Technology. From 1996 to 1997, he became the supervisor of the Curriculum Development Unit in the Technical Affairs Department of Universities. He then returned to Riyadh University of Technology as assistant Dean, then Dean from 1998 to 2001.

Minister of Education
Ahmed bin Mohammad Al-Issa was announced as the new Minister of Education of Saudi Arabia on 11 December 2015, succeeding to Azzam Al-Dakhil. As Minister of Education, he set a high priority on e-learning and more technology in the classroom, and initiated several programs around the kingdom to promote this issue.

In August 2016, Al-Issa and Irina Bokova signed two agreements to expand the number of UNESCO Chairs in Saudi universities, and the establishment of the UNESCO Junior Professional Officer Program.

In September 2017, during his official visit to Sweden, he  signed a cooperation agreement with Swedish Minister of Higher Education and Research Helene Hellmark Knutsson to enhance education cooperation between Saudi Arabia and Sweden, and increase the number of Saudi scholarships to Swedish universities.

Other mandates
Since July 2012: Vice chairman of the Riyadh Schools
Since June 2012: Advisor and board member at MiSK Foundation
Since March 2008: Member of the International Commission for Quality Assurance in Higher Education in the free zones in Dubai.
2011-2012: Director general of strategic studies at the Royal Court
2008-2009: Director of Al Yamamah University
1997-2001: Dean of Riyadh College of Technology

Publications
Higher Education in Saudi Arabia: A Quest for Identity, Dar Al Saqi Publishing, Beirut, 2010
Education Reform in KSA: Lack of Political Vision, Religious Cultural Obsession, and Educational Management Failure, Dar Al Saqi Publishing, Beirut, 2009
Education in KSA: Policies, Systems and Future, Dar Ezzaytouna, Riyadh, 2005

References

External links
Official biography

Living people
Education ministers of Saudi Arabia
1960 births